Wendy Alison van der Plank is an English actress best known for playing the title role in the ITV children's series Wizadora.

Career
Van der Plank's first television appearance was in the BBC comedy series Spin Off. After appearing in one episode of Casualty, she played the role of Hilly in the ITV drama Forever Green before being cast as Wizadora.

In addition she appeared as Sharon in the radio sitcom All That Jazz, in which the creator commented that he was "...knocked out by Wendy van der Plank", and that "She'd never done any radio before and was largely unknown, but she came close to stealing the show. She really threw herself into it and I thought she was hilarious... She was just great!".

She has also appeared in various theatrical shows, including The King and I in 1987, and Quasimodo the Hunchback of Notre Dame in 1988, both at the Queen's Theatre in Hornchurch.

Personal life 
She currently works for the Boiling Kettle Theatre Company in Devon.

Selected filmography 
 Wizadora (1993–1996)
 Forever Green (1989–1992)
 Casualty episode Charity (1989)
 Spin Off (1988)

References

External links 
 

Living people
British radio actresses
British stage actresses
British television actresses
British voice actresses
20th-century British actresses
21st-century British actresses
Year of birth missing (living people)